The following artists and bands have performed smooth jazz.

Saxophonists

Guitarists

Pianists/Keyboardists

Drummers and other percussionists

Bassists

Trumpeters / Flugelhornists

Flutists

Bands/Groups

Vocalists

Other Instruments

Composers

Disc jockeys

See also
 List of jazz fusion artists

References

Smooth jazz